is a 1945 Japanese action drama film written and directed by Akira Kurosawa. It is based on the novel by Tsuneo Tomita, son of Tomita Tsunejirō, the earliest disciple of judo. It was filmed in early 1945 in Japan towards the end of World War II. Unlike the original Sugata Sanshiro, the sequel is in part considered a propaganda film.

It is believed by some to be the earliest known film sequel whose title is simply the original title followed by a number, predating the likes of French Connection II (1975) by decades, although possibly mistaken as the added kanji  (Zoku) is not a numeral but simply means "Continuation" or "Sequel" sort of in the style of Another Thin Man or The Invisible Man Returns.

Plot
In the 1880s, a martial arts student continues his quest to become a judo master, from that discipline's founder. Eventually, he learns enough to demonstrate his skill in a boxing match between American and Japanese fighters at the end of the movie. The whole movie is actually about the rivalry between karate and judo martial artists, and Sanshiro's struggle to do what is right. On one side there is the morally right thing to do, and on the other the rules in the dojo. Eventually he decides to break all of the rules, leave the dojo, fight the American boxer and, also, the karate masters. He wins both fights and at the end of the movie smiles while washing his face, finally able to sleep and finally be happy.

Cast 
Denjirō Ōkōchi - Shogoro Yano
Susumu Fujita - Sanshiro Sugata
Ryūnosuke Tsukigata - Gennosuke Higaki
Akitake Kōno - Genzaburo Higaki
Yukiko Todoroki - Sayo
Soji Kiyokawa - Yujiro Toda
Masayuki Mori - Yoshima Dan
Seiji Miyaguchi - Kohei Tsuzaki
Ko Ishida - Daisuburo Hidarimonji
Kazu Hikari - Kihei Sekine
Kokuten Kōdō - Buddhist Priest Saiduchi
Ichiro Sugai - Yoshizo Fubuki
Osman Yusuf - American Sailor
Roy James - William Lister

Critical reviews
In his review of the original Sanshiro Sugata for Bright Lights Film Journal, Brian Libby noted that the film is "less propaganda-oriented" than its sequel. In the original film, "fighting is but a vehicle for a larger spiritual quest" whereas the sequel "promotes Japanese judo's superiority to Western boxing", setting a different tone. Christian Blauvelt, writing a review for Slant Magazine, agreed that the film is somewhat tainted by noticeable propaganda. Sanshiro's victory against the American boxer "is taken as a sign of Japanese physical, moral, and spiritual superiority". He also noted that "Sanshiro comes to the aid of defenseless Japanese who are being beaten up by a drunken American sailor". Historian David Conrad has contextualized the film as a "crude bit of wish-fulfillment" during the last weeks of World War II when Japan's leaders "moved the war's frontlines to the only place it could still be won: the realm of fantasy."

Christian Blauvelt however saw merit in the film as illustrated in the battle against the brothers of Gennosuke Higaki, the original film's villain: "Their battle takes place on a snow-covered hillside and matches the natural beauty of the first film's windstorm finale. In his years apprenticing at P.C.L. [Photo Chemical Laboratories, which later became Toho], Kurosawa had become exposed to the films of John Ford, many of which played in Japan, before the foreign-film embargo that accompanied Japan's declaration of war on the United States in 1941. Like Ford, Kurosawa would emphasize the place of landscape in his films, often pairing his characters' emotional turmoil with the Elements. The rain in One Wonderful Sunday, Rashomon, or Seven Samurai, the beating sun in Stray Dog, the sinkhole in Drunken Angel, the snowfall in The Idiot, the wind in Dersu Uzala, and the crashing waves of Kagemusha would express some emotional anguish of the characters and, as a kind of cinematic synecdoche, society as a whole."

Home media
The film was released in 2010 as part of a 4 DVD box set of Kurosawa's early films under the following designation:
Eclipse Series 23: The First Films of Akira Kurosawa. The Criterion Collection.

References

External links 

 Sanshiro Sugata PartII  at the Japanese Movie Database

1945 films
Films directed by Akira Kurosawa
Toho films
Japanese black-and-white films
Films with screenplays by Akira Kurosawa
Japanese action adventure films
1940s action adventure films
Films set in 1887
Films set in Yokohama
Judo films